Fenioux may refer to the following places in France:

 Fenioux, Charente-Maritime, a commune in the Charente-Maritime department
 Fenioux, Deux-Sèvres, a commune in the Deux-Sèvres department